Saini is a caste of North India who were traditionally landowners (zamindars) and farmers. Sainis claim to be descendants of a king, Shurasena, as well as of Krishna and Porus, and to be related to the ancient Shoorsaini clan, noted in Puranic literature. The Saini community is given representation in government jobs and educational institutes as an Other Backward Class (OBC) in the states of Uttar Pradesh, Punjab, Haryana, Rajasthan and Madhya Pradesh.

As both a statutory agricultural tribe and a designated martial race during the British Raj era that followed the Indian Rebellion of 1857, Sainis had been chiefly engaged in both agriculture and military service. Since the independence of India, they have diversified into white-collar professions.

Sainis profess in both Hinduism and Sikhism. They have a national organisation called Saini Rajput Mahasabha located in Delhi, established in 1920.

History

Mythology

The Sainis of Jalandhar and Hoshiarpur districts claim to be the descendants of the Rajputs of the Yaduvanshi or Surasena lineage who ruled these kingdoms, who came to these areas to avoid forced conversion to Islam.

Academic
Gahlot and Banshidhar indicate some commonality in origin with Rajput Malis of Rajputana, who also claim to be of Rajput descent.

British era

During the British period Sainis were classified as both a statutory agricultural tribe and, later, a martial race. The latter was an administrative device based on the now-discredited theories of scientific racism: ethnic communities were categorised as being either martial or non-martial, with the latter being those who were thought to be unfit to serve in armies due to their sedentary lifestyles. The community was also one of several peasant peoples who benefitted from the development of the Punjab Canal Colonies, through which they obtained land grants from the British authorities, especially in the Chenab Colony following the introduction of the Punjab Land Alienation Act, 1900.

Some Saini landlords were also appointed as zaildars, or revenue-collectors, in various districts.

Marriage
According to the Anthropological Survey of India, "The Saini are endogamous community and observe exogamy at village and gotra level." Remarriage after the death of a spouse is permitted nowadays, as is divorce.

See also
Saini (surname)

See also
Surasena Kingdom

References

External links
SainiOnline.com
SainiInfo.com

 
Indian castes
Indian surnames
Punjabi tribes
Social groups of Punjab, India
Social groups of Haryana
Articles containing video clips